The 2013 6 Hours of Fuji was intended to have been an automobile endurance race held at the Fuji Speedway, Oyama, Japan on 20 October 2013.  The race was the sixth round of the 2013 FIA World Endurance Championship season.  Heavy rains forced race officials to start the race under safety car conditions, completing eight laps before the race was temporarily stopped due to no improvement in track conditions.  Following a two-hour delay the race was restarted once more under the safety car, lapping another eight circuits before officials stopped the race again and eventually called an end to the event.  The No. 7 Toyota was declared the race winner, gaining the lead following a pit stop under caution from the Audi which started on pole position, while the majority of the field finished in the same position they started the race. Only half points were awarded towards the various championships being held under the WEC umbrella.

As a result of the race, which did not take the green flag, the FIA imposed a rule change effective 2014 where points are only scored if two laps are run under green flag conditions to prevent a repeat of what happened in Fuji.

Qualifying

Qualifying result
Pole position winners in each class are marked in bold.

Race

Race result
Class winners in bold.  Cars failing to complete 70% of winner's distance marked as Not Classified (NC).

References

Fuji
Fuji
6 Hours of Fuji